The 1999 Men's European Water Polo Championship took place in Florence, Italy from September 2 to September 11, 1999. It was organised by the Ligue Européenne de Natation.

Teams

GROUP A

 
 
 
 

GROUP B

Preliminary round

GROUP A

Thursday September 2, 1999 

Friday September 3, 1999 

Saturday September 4, 1999 

Sunday September 5, 1999 

Monday September 6, 1999

GROUP B

Thursday September 2, 1999 

Friday September 3, 1999 

Saturday September 4, 1999 

Sunday September 5, 1999 

Monday September 6, 1999

Quarterfinals
Wednesday September 8, 1999

Semifinals
Thursday September 9, 1999 — Winners Round

Thursday September 9, 1999 — Losers Round

Finals
Wednesday September 8, 1999 — Eleventh Place Match

Wednesday September 8, 1999 — Ninth Place Match

Friday September 10, 1999 — Seventh Place Match

Friday September 10, 1999 — Fifth Place Match

Saturday September 11, 1999 — Bronze Medal Match

Saturday September 11, 1999 — Gold Medal Match

Final ranking

Individual awards
Most Valuable Player
???
Best Goalkeeper
???

References
  Results

Men
Men's European Water Polo Championship
International water polo competitions hosted by Italy
European Championship
Water polo